Muiris Ó Gibealláin, Irish jurist, singer, philosopher, poet and musician, died 1328.

Ó Gibealláin was a member of a family originally from Elphin in what is now County Roscommon, who were notable jurists and churchmen in medieval Ireland.

The Annals of Connacht give a lengthy obituary for him, under the year 1328:

Muiris O Gibillain, chief master in Ireland of Law both old and new, Civil and Canon, a learned and erudite philosopher accomplished in poetry and Ogham lore and many other arts, a choral canon at Tuam and at Elphin and at Achonry and at Killala and at Annaghdown and at Clonfert, Official and general judge of the archdiocese, rested in Christ.

The surname is now generally rendered as Giblin, Giblan, or Giblon.

References

 Musical instruments in Ireland 9th 14th centuries: A review of the organological evidence, Ann Buckley, pp. 13–57, Irish Musical Studies i, Blackrock, County Dublin, 1990
 Music and musicians in medieval Irish society, Ann Buckley, pp. 165–190, Early Music xxviii, no.2, May 2000
 Music in Prehistoric and Medieval Ireland, Ann Buckley, pp. 744–813, in A New History of Ireland, volume one, Oxford, 2005

External links
http://celt.ucc.ie/publishd.html
http://www.irishtimes.com/ancestor/surname/index.cfm?fuseaction=Go.&UserID=

Irish jurists
Irish male singers
Medieval Irish poets
Musicians from County Sligo
Musicians from County Galway
Musicians from County Roscommon
14th-century Irish writers
14th-century Irish judges
1328 deaths
14th-century Irish poets
Year of birth unknown
Irish male poets
Irish-language writers
Irish-language singers
14th-century Irish musicians